Geetha may refer to:

Geetha (actress) (born 1962), Indian actress
P. Geetha Jeevan (born 1970), Tamil Nadu minister
Geetha Salam (1946–2018), Indian actor also known as Abdul Salam
Geetha Vijayan (born 1972), Indian actress
Sathi Geetha (born 1983), Indian sprinter
Geetha (1981 film), a 1981 South Indian film
Geetha (2019 film), a 2019 Kannada film
Geetha (TV series), a 2020 Kannada serial
GEETHA, a syllabic abbreviation for the Hellenic National Defense General Staff (ΓΕΕΘΑ)
Geetha Angara homicide, a 2005 murder case